Bryan Gil Salvatierra (born 11 February 2001) is a Spanish professional footballer who plays as a winger or a left midfielder for La Liga club Sevilla, on loan from Premier League club Tottenham Hotspur, and the Spain national team. 

Gil began his professional career at Sevilla, and also had loan spells with Leganés and Eibar in La Liga, totalling 54 games and six goals.

Gil won a silver medal at the 2020 Olympics with Spain's under-23 team. He made his senior international debut in 2021.

Club career

Sevilla
Born in L'Hospitalet de Llobregat, Barcelona, Catalonia, Gil and his family moved to Barbate, Andalusia when he was a child and he was mainly raised there. In 2012, he joined Sevilla FC's youth setup, moving there from his hometown side Barbate CF. Promoted to the reserves ahead of the 2018–19 season, he made his senior debut on 26 August 2018, starting in a 0–1 Segunda División B home loss against UD Ibiza.

Gil scored his first senior goal on 8 September 2018, netting the equaliser in a 2–1 home win against San Fernando CD. On 12 December, already a regular starter for the B-side, he renewed his contract until 2022. On 23 February 2019, he was given a straight red card in a 2–1 win at Granada CF B, and two teammates were also sent off for arguing the dismissal.

Gil made his first team – and La Liga – debut on 6 January 2019, coming on as a late substitute for goalscorer Wissam Ben Yedder in a 1–1 home draw against Atlético Madrid. He made ten more appearances – all off the bench – in his first season for the team, and scored on 25 April to conclude a 5–0 win over Rayo Vallecano at the Ramón Sánchez Pizjuán Stadium; the strike made him the first child of the 21st century to net in Spain's top flight.

On 29 November 2019, Gil scored his first goal in European competition when he scored in a UEFA Europa League game against Qarabağ FK which ended 2–0 in favour of Sevilla. The following 31 January, he moved to fellow top tier side CD Leganés on loan for the remainder of the season. On 19 July 2020, Gil scored against Real Madrid in a 2–2 home draw on the final day of the season.

Gil was loaned to fellow top tier side SD Eibar for the 2020–21 campaign on 5 October 2020, along with teammate Alejandro Pozo. He scored four goals and assisted as many, as the team ended the season relegated.

Tottenham Hotspur
Gil signed for Tottenham Hotspur at the beginning of the 2021–22 season in a fee part-exchange deal with Argentine Erik Lamela heading to Sevilla. Sky Sports reported the initial fee of £21.6 million, and the contract length was for five years.  

Gil made his debut for the club on 19 August 2021 by starting in the UEFA Europa Conference League first leg tie against Paços de Ferreira, which ended in a 1–0 defeat. Ten days later, he made his Premier League debut in a 1–0 home win over Watford as an 88th-minute replacement for goalscorer Son Heung-min. His progress was limited by a thigh injury against Burnley in October, followed by a COVID-19 diagnosis in December.

Loan to Valencia
Having played just 85 minutes over nine league games, Gil was linked to a move back to La Liga in January 2022, to either Real Sociedad or Valencia. On the last day of the month, he was loaned to the latter for the remainder of the season. He made 17 total appearances for the club, including their penalty shootout defeat to Real Betis in the 2022 Copa del Rey Final on 23 April, in which he came on for goalscorer Hugo Duro with five minutes of regulation time remaining.

Return to Tottenham
During the Summer break Gil returned to Spurs and was included in the club's tour of Korea. Gil has made a number of appearances off the bench and notably on the 12 October, he came off the bench in the Champions League and won his Spurs side a penalty in stoppage time against Eintracht Frankfurt.

Loan to Sevilla
On 30 January 2023, it was announced that Gil would be returning to Sevilla on loan for the remainder of the season.

International career

Gil was a member of the Spain under-19 team that won the 2019 UEFA European Championship in Armenia, starting in the 2–0 final win over neighbours Portugal.

In March 2021, Gil received his first call-up to the Spain national team for the group stage of the 2022 FIFA World Cup qualification. He made his debut on 25 March 2021 against Greece, as a 65th-minute substitute for Sergio Canales in a 1–1 draw in Granada.

Gil won a silver medal at the 2020 Olympic tournament in Japan, delayed until the following year due to the COVID-19 pandemic.

Career statistics

Club

International

Honours
Sevilla
UEFA Europa League: 2019–20

Spain U19
UEFA European Under-19 Championship: 2019

Spain U23
Summer Olympic silver medal: 2020

Spain
UEFA Nations League runner-up: 2020–21

References

External links

Profile at the Tottenham Hotspur F.C. website

2001 births
Living people
People from Barbate
Sportspeople from the Province of Cádiz
Spanish footballers
Footballers from Andalusia
Association football wingers
La Liga players
Segunda División B players
Premier League players
Sevilla Atlético players
Sevilla FC players
CD Leganés players
SD Eibar footballers
Tottenham Hotspur F.C. players
Valencia CF players
Spain youth international footballers
Spain under-21 international footballers
UEFA Europa League winning players
Spain international footballers
Olympic footballers of Spain
Footballers at the 2020 Summer Olympics
Spanish expatriate footballers
Expatriate footballers in England
Spanish expatriate sportspeople in England
Olympic medalists in football
Olympic silver medalists for Spain
Medalists at the 2020 Summer Olympics